The Pakistani national cricket team visited Zimbabwe in March 1998 and played a two-match Test series against the Zimbabwean national cricket team followed by two Limited Overs Internationals (LOI). Pakistan won the Test series 1–0. Pakistan were captained by Rashid Latif and Zimbabwe by Alistair Campbell. Pakistan won the LOI series 2-0

Test series summary

1st Test

2nd Test

ODI series summary

1st ODI

2nd ODI

References

External links

1998 in Pakistani cricket
1998 in Zimbabwean cricket
Pakistani cricket tours of Zimbabwe
International cricket competitions from 1997–98 to 2000
Zimbabwean cricket seasons from 1980–81 to 1999–2000